Indian Mountain Lake is a census-designated place (CDP) in Carbon County and Monroe County, Pennsylvania. It is part of Northeastern Pennsylvania.

The Carbon County portion of the CDP is in Penn Forest Township, while the Monroe County portion is in Tunkhannock and Chestnuthill townships. As of the 2020 census, the population of the community was 4,733. There are 3,262 single-family residential building lots in the community as of 2020 records.

The community of Indian Mountain Lake lies at the southern edge of the Poconos, on top of Pohopoco Mountain and extending north to the valley of Mud Run, which is impounded to form the small Indian Mountain Lake. The western edge of the CDP follows Pennsylvania Route 534, and Pennsylvania Route 115 crosses the eastern side of the community.

References

Census-designated places in Carbon County, Pennsylvania
Census-designated places in Monroe County, Pennsylvania
Census-designated places in Pennsylvania